Radim Novák (2 April 1978 – 12 May 2020) was a Czech football player, who played for FK Ústí nad Labem as a goalkeeper.

References

External links
 Profile at FK Ústí nad Labem website 

1978 births
2020 deaths
People from Děčín
Czech footballers
Association football goalkeepers
Place of birth missing
Czech First League players
FK Ústí nad Labem players
Sportspeople from the Ústí nad Labem Region